Statistics of (Finnish football) Mestaruussarja in the 1982 season.

Overview
Preliminary Stage was contested by 12 teams, and higher 8 teams go into Championship Group. Lower 4 teams fought in promotion/relegation group with higher 4 teams of Ykkönen.

Kuusysi Lahti won the championship.

Preliminary stage

Table

Results

Championship group

Table

The points were halved (rounded upwards in uneven cases) after the preliminary stage.

Results

Promotion and relegation group

Table

The teams obtained bonus points on the basis of their preliminary stage position.

Results

References
Finland - List of final tables (RSSSF)

Mestaruussarja seasons
Fin
Fin
1